Mazagran is a French village, part of the municipality (commune) of Tourcelles-Chaumont, in the department of Ardennes, Grand Est.

History
The locality was named after a battle holed up in 1840 in the Algerian town of Mazagran; between Algerian resistance forces and French troops, during the French conquest of Algeria.

Geography
Situated in an agricultural plateau few km from Tourcelles-Chaumont and Leffincourt; it has a central roundabout that is a junction point of several national roads to Reims, Vouziers, Châlons-en-Champagne, Rethel and Charleville-Mézières. The proper village is composed by few and scattered farms.

Literature
The French writer André Dhôtel set his 1947 novel "Le Plateau de Mazagran" in the village.

References

Villages in Grand Est